Walter Robert Matthews  (22 September 1881 – 4 December 1973) was an Anglican priest, theologian, and philosopher.

Early life and education
Born on 22 September 1881 in Camberwell, London, to parents Philip Walter Matthews, a banker, and Sophia Alice Self, he was educated at Wilson's School and trained for the priesthood at King's College London.

Ordained ministry
He was ordained deacon in 1907 and priest in 1908 and was a curate at St Mary Abbots' Kensington and St Peter's Regent Square. After that he was a lecturer in and then a professor of theology at King's College London. From 1918 he was also Dean of the college. In 1931 he became an Honorary Chaplain to the King and Dean of Exeter. Then in 1934 he became Dean of St Paul's, a post he held for 33 years. At the time of his appointment, he was president-elect of the Modern Churchmen's Union. He was described by his predecessor, William Inge, as something of an "Orthodox Modernist".

On 2 June 1940 the term "miracle of Dunkirk" was used for the first time by Matthews in a speech. He was praising the rescue of thousands of British soldiers and their allies from being encircled by the German Army in France.

He died on 4 December 1973.

Published works
Matthews was an author. Among his works:

 Three Sermons on Human Nature and a Dissertation upon the Nature of Virtue. Editor. By Joseph Butler. London: G. Bell and Sons. 1914.
 King's College Lectures on Immortality. Editor. By J. F. Bethune-Baker; A. Caldecott; Hastings Rashdall; Wm. Brown; H. Maurice Relton. London: University of London Press. 1920.

References

Citations

Works cited

External links
 
 

1881 births
1973 deaths
20th-century English Anglican priests
Academics of King's College London
Alumni of the Theological Department of King's College London
Anglican philosophers
Deans of Exeter
Deans of King's College London
Deans of St Paul's
English Anglican theologians
Fellows of King's College London
Honorary Chaplains to the King
Honorary Chaplains to the Queen
Knights Commander of the Royal Victorian Order
Members of the Order of the Companions of Honour
People educated at Wilson's School, Wallington